Ludovico Mazzolino (1480 – c. 1528) - also known as Mazzolini da Ferrara, Lodovico Ferraresa, and Il Ferrarese - was an Italian Renaissance painter active in Ferrara and Bologna.

Biography
He was born and died in Ferrara. He appears to have studied under such as Lorenzo Costa, who also may have trained Dosso Dossi, and came under the influence of Ercole Roberti. In 1521 he married Giovanna, the daughter of Bartolomeo Vacchi, a Venetian painter. Much of his work was commissioned by the duke Ercole I d'Este from Ferrara. Mazzolino was influenced by il Garofalo and Boccaccino. He is known for devotional cabinet pictures, in a style somewhat regressive, or primitive, relative to the modern classicism then emerging. For example, his Massacre canvas has a turbulent and cartoonish crowding.

The exact date, or even year, of his death is not known, but he died during a plague which devastated the area.

Paintings at National Gallery, London
The Holy Family with Saint Francis
Christ and the Woman taken in Adultery 
Christ disputing with the Doctors
The Holy Family with Saint Nicholas of Tolentino
The Nativity

Selected works

Works elsewhere
Christ disputing with Doctors (1520–25) (Gemaeldegalerie, Berlin)
The Tribute Money (Christ Church, Oxford)
Massacre of the Innocents (1515–1520, Uffizi)
Madonna and Child with St Joseph (1522) (rediscovered September, 2009, Cheltenham, UK)
Adoration of the Shepherds (c. 1524) Ringling Museum Sarasota)
Madonna with Sainy Antonio Abbot (1525, Chantilly)
Circumcision (1526, Vienna)
Christ Purging the Temple (c. 1527) (Alnwick Castle, Northumberland, UK)
The Holy Family in a Landscape (Alte Pinakothek, Munich, Germany)

External links

Works by Lodovico Mazzolino at National Gallery in London

1480 births
1520s deaths
15th-century Italian painters
Italian male painters
16th-century Italian painters
Painters from Ferrara
16th-century deaths from plague (disease)